Huidong County (Yi:  hop do xiep) is a county in the far south of Sichuan Province, China. It is under the administration of the Liangshan Yi Autonomous Prefecture.

Climate

References

 
County-level divisions of Sichuan
Liangshan Yi Autonomous Prefecture
Amdo